El Higo is a corregimiento in San Carlos District, Panamá Oeste Province, Panama with a population of 2,710 as of 2010. Its population as of 1990 was 1,920; its population as of 2000 was 2,341.

References

Corregimientos of Panamá Oeste Province